Lincoln South was an electoral district of the Legislative Assembly of the Parliament of the Province of Canada, in Canada West (now Ontario). It was created in 1841, upon the establishment of the Province of Canada by the union of Upper Canada and Lower Canada. Lincoln South was represented by one member in the Legislative Assembly.  It was amalgamated prior to the election of 1848.

Boundaries 

Lincoln South electoral district was located in the southern portion of the Niagara Peninsula (now in the Regional Municipality of Niagara).

The Union Act, 1840 had merged the two provinces of Upper Canada and Lower Canada into the Province of Canada, with a single Parliament.  The separate parliaments of Lower Canada and Upper Canada were abolished.Union Act, 1840, 3 & 4 Vict. (UK), c. 35, s. 2.  The Union Act provided that the pre-existing electoral boundaries of Upper Canada would continue to be used in the new Parliament, unless altered by the Union Act itself.

Lincoln County was one of the electoral districts which was altered by the Union Act. When originally created in 1792, Lincoln County had been composed of four ridings, each sending a member to the Upper Canada Legislative Assembly.  The Union Act instead split Lincoln County into two separate electoral districts, each containing two of the former ridings.

The Union Act defined Lincoln South as follows: 

The boundaries of the third and fourth ridings of Luncoln County had originally been set out by a proclamation of the first Lieutenant Governor of Upper Canada, John Graves Simcoe, in 1792:

The boundaries of the third and fourth ridings had been further defined by a statute of Upper Canada in 1798:

Those boundaries were used until Lincoln South was amalgamated prior to the 1848 election.

Members of the Legislative Assembly 

Lincoln South was represented by one member in the Legislative Assembly. The following were the members for Lincoln South.

Abolition 

The electoral district was amalgamated prior to the election of 1848.

References 

Electoral districts of Canada West